James Edward Traue  (born 10 February 1932) is a New Zealand librarian. He was chief librarian of the Alexander Turnbull Library from 1973 to 1990.

Early life and family
Traue was born in Auckland on 10 February 1932, the son of Albert Edward Traue and Evelin Florence  Traue (née Webb). He was educated at Rotorua District High School and Hamilton High School, and went on to study at Auckland University College, graduating Master of Arts with second-class honours in 1957. He also earned a Diploma of the New Zealand Library School.

In 1973, Traue married Julia Margaret Bergen.

Career
Traue worked as a librarian with the New Zealand National Library Service from 1957 to 1961, and then the General Assembly Library from 1962 to 1971. He spent 1965–1966 working at the Library of Congress in Washington, D.C., and was chief librarian of the New Zealand Department of Scientific and Industrial Research between 1971 and 1973. Traue served as chief librarian of the Alexander Turnbull Library in Wellington from 1973 and 1990.

In 1961, Traue was a member of the National Committee for the Abolition of the Death Penalty. He was editor of the 11th edition of Who's Who in New Zealand in 1978. He has written extensively on the history and purpose of research libraries and the nature of research.

Honours
In the 2006 Queen's Birthday Honours, Traue was appointed an Officer of the New Zealand Order of Merit, for services to the library profession.

References

1932 births
Living people
People from Auckland
People educated at Rotorua Boys' High School
People educated at Hamilton Boys' High School
University of Auckland alumni
New Zealand librarians
Officers of the New Zealand Order of Merit